Regufe is a neighbourhood of the Portuguese city of Póvoa de Varzim. It is Regufe is located in the south part of Matriz/Mariadeira district. It has very different topologies and little development, mostly of residential nature.

Regufe is an ancient place: a former village around the town of Póvoa de Varzim. Regufe's name is of Suebi origin from Rekaufus: Rec + wulf (wolf).

It was a farming and cattle area, but in its farms and woodlands, houses and buildings started being raised. In certain areas of the neighbourhood, mostly, in the border with Vila do Conde, this kind of living can still be seen.

Farol de Regufe (22 metres tall) is the symbol of the quarter; it is a metallic lighthouse painted red.

Neighbourhoods of Póvoa de Varzim